Monica Anna Maria Bellucci (born 30 September 1964) is an Italian actress and model. She began her career as a fashion model, modelling for Dolce & Gabbana, Cartier, and Dior, before transitioning to Italian films and later American and French films. 

Bellucci made her film debut in Francesco Laudadio's Italian comedy La Riffa (1991). The following year she played a bride of Dracula in Francis Ford Coppola's gothic horror romance film Bram Stoker's Dracula (1992). For her leading role in The Apartment (1996), Bellucci received a nomination at the 1997 César Award for Most Promising Actress. She played Malèna Scordia in the Giuseppe Tornatore's acclaimed Italian romantic drama Malèna (2000). Bellucci starred in one of the highest-grossing French language films in the United States, Brotherhood of the Wolf (2001). She starred in Gaspar Noé's controversial arthouse thriller film Irréversible (2002), which premiered at the Cannes Film Festival.

Bellucci portrayed Persephone in the 2003 science-fiction films The Matrix Reloaded and The Matrix Revolutions. In 2004, she portrayed Mary Magdalene in Mel Gibson's biblical drama The Passion of the Christ (2004). At the age of 50, by appearing in the 2015 James Bond film Spectre, Bellucci became the oldest Bond girl in the history of the franchise. She has since acted in films such as The Whistleblower (2010), The Wonders (2014), On the Milky Road (2016), The Best Years of a Life (2019), The Man Who Sold His Skin (2020), and Memory (2022).

Among her accolades are two Globo d'oro Awards, two Nastro d'Argento Awards, a Donostia Award, and a David Special Award. Bellucci received the Knight insignia of the Legion of Honour in 2016. She is a permanent member of the Academy of Motion Picture Arts and Sciences.

Early life
Monica Anna Maria Bellucci was born in Città di Castello, Umbria, on 30 September 1964. She is the only child of Brunella Briganti, her mother, an amateur painter, and Pasquale Bellucci, her father, who owned a trucking company. Bellucci grew up in Lama (now Selci-Lama), in the comune of San Giustino, on the outskirts of Città di Castello.

Bellucci was known to be an "intelligent child". Her parents described her as "discreet" and "aware of her advantageous physique", with a growing interest in fashion. She was distant from other children her age, regularly making detours to get home after school and did not spend time with them around the comunes public space, with her father recalling that she complained that everyone stared at her. By then, her father had helped her to gain self-confidence.

Career

Modelling

Bellucci began modelling at age 13 by posing for a photographer friend of the family in Città di Castello. 

Piero Montanucci, a hairdresser working in Città di Castello, discovered Bellucci, then an 18-year-old student, and she became his model, getting styled for her first professional photo shoots. At that time, Montanucci was her mentor. 

Bellucci, who planned to become a lawyer, studied at the university of Perugia. She was noticed by a friend of her father, the director of a fashion agency, and she made her runway debut. Città di Castello-based fashion entrepreneur Pina Alberti was the first to dress her for a fashion show where she enthralled the crowd, held in 1983 at the Teatro degli Illuminati (the city's municipal theatre) as part of the Momento Donna event hosted by Maria Giovanna Elmi. Bellucci intended to finance her studies by working as a model. Thus, her modelling career began. 

In 1988, Bellucci was featured on the cover of Vogue Spain and Elle France, photographed by Oliviero Toscani.

A friend encouraged her to apply to Milan modelling agencies during her studies. Bellucci moved to one of Europe's fashion centres, Milan, where Elite Model Management spotted her and signed her to a contract in 1989. Her work as a model for Elite led her to travel soon after, and she decided to leave the university due to this context. Bellucci would say later that being a lawyer would not have suited her. Modelling agent Piero Piazzi witnessed Bellucci's debuts and considered she could be an actress. Represented by Elite, she appeared in numerous international advertising campaigns, and Dolce & Gabbana hired her to become its muse.

By 1989, she became a prominent fashion model in Milan, Paris, and New York City. Bellucci was the Italian model that fashion brands vied to sign her. She was already a millionaire. 

In 1991, Bellucci was the brand ambassador for French personal care L'Oréal. The same year she appeared in the Sports Illustrated Swimsuit Issue, which featured photographs of her in the Caribbean.

In 1993, she met Giuseppe Tornatore for the first time when he directed her in a Dolce & Gabbana perfume television advertisement.

In the 1990s, Bellucci regularly appeared in "sexy" calendar shoots, beginning in 1997 at the age of 33 when Richard Avedon photographed her for the Pirelli Calendar. In 1997, Bellucci became brand ambassador and muse to Cartier. Cartier would also accompany Bellucci throughout her acting career, notably on the red carpets, wearing high jewellery collections.

In 1999, Fabrizio Ferri photographed her for the Max magazine's calendar. She posed for the GQ calendar in 2000 and was photographed by Gian Paolo Barbieri.

Bellucci first appeared on the cover of Paris Match in June 2001. She was featured nude with caviar placed on her breasts on the 2001 cover of Esquire, and the photograph was used nine months later for the November cover of GQs Italian edition. Many photographs of Bellucci taken by Ferry, notably where she was drizzled with honey, appeared regularly in the two direct competitor magazines, GQ and Esquire.

In 2004, while pregnant with her daughter Deva, Bellucci posed nude for the Italian cover of Vanity Fair in protest against an Italian law that "restricts the provision of fertility treatment to stable heterosexual couples and excludes single women or same-sex couples". It also "restricts surrogacy and research using human embryos, forbids sperm and egg donation, and limits the number of embryos created with in-vitro techniques to three". 

From 2006 to 2010, Bellucci was one of Dior's brand ambassadors and the face of a range of products.

In 2007, Cartier designed a collection of luxury diamond jewellery with Bellucci as the inspiration.

She posed pregnant and semi-nude again for the April 2010 issue of Vanity Fair. In 2010, Bellucci appeared in a television advertisement for Martini Gold, a collaboration between Martini and Dolce & Gabbana.

In 2012, she became the face of Dolce & Gabbana's Monica Lipstick Collection. Bellucci was signed to Storm Management in London and D'Management Group in Milan. In December 2012, she made her eighth cover of Paris Match.

In August 2015, Bellucci was featured on the cover of GQ Italy for the seventh time.

On 10 April 2016, the Karin Models agency, representing Bellucci, opened an official Instagram account for her.

In 2017, she made another appearance on the cover of GQ Italy.

Bellucci was chosen as the face of German Nivea personal care products for its 2018 and 2019 campaigns. She walked the runway for the Spring 2019 Milan fashion week for Dolce and Gabbana. Joining her included Isabella Rossellini, Eva Herzigová and Helena Christensen, continuing the influx of 90s supermodels returning to the spotlight of fashion. 

In 2020, still an ambassador for Cartier, Bellucci was a model for the (Sur)Naturel high jewellery creations composed of emeralds, opals, beryls, sapphires, and diamonds.

Throughout the decades, Bellucci appeared on the covers of Elle, IO Donna, German magazine Madame, Marie Claire, Maxim, and international editions of Harper's Bazaar, Vanity Fair, and Vogue, among others.

Acting

Bellucci made her screen debut in 1990 when Italian director Dino Risi hired her for the television movie Vita coi figli after seeing her photograph in a magazine. 

In 1991, she made her film debut in La Riffa, playing a role Italian director Francesco Laudadio offered her.

In 1992, Bellucci played a bride of Dracula in Bram Stoker's Dracula after Roman Coppola spotted her in the Italian magazine Zoom and then implored his father, Francis Ford, to offer her a role in his film. Francis Ford Coppola then called her to arrange a meeting in Los Angeles while she was in New York for a photo shoot. Discussing with Copolla, she clearly understood that she would embark on an acting career. Although Coppola wanted her to stay in Los Angeles for filming, she decided that her subsequent experiences as an actress should be in Italy and, by her own admission, felt that her English level needed improvement. Nevertheless, her role in Dracula exposed her to the international audience for the first time.

Bellucci said her minor role in Dracula was an experience, and considering a move into acting, she returned to Italy to take acting classes. "I craved it ... I needed to act", she said, even though she recalled a challenging period while all her friends were leaving the Faculty. Bellucci had to overcome, not without difficulty, the prejudices related to modelling and her physical appearance and had to work to establish her credibility. She starred in Italian films for the next four years but was dissatisfied due to the country's lack of opportunities as she aspired to an international acting career. She conceded that the Italian film industry needed to invest more money to promote a film internationally. Bellucci eventually moved to France in anticipation of enhanced career prospects.

In 1997, Bellucci was nominated for a César Award for Most Promising Actress for her portrayal of Lisa in The Apartment (1996), which launched her towards stardom in France and strengthened her position as an actress. The film was critically acclaimed by BBC's Almar Haflidason, who gave it the maximum rating of five stars. Bellucci's "break-out role" was in the European arthouse film The Apartment, wrote Gavanndra Hodge of The Sunday Times. That year, she made a significant impact on European audiences. Bellucci slowed down her modelling career around this time. The Apartment later won a British Academy Film Award for Best Film Not in the English Language.

The Italian film L'ultimo capodanno earned Bellucci a 1998 Globo d'oro award for Best Actress.

In 2000, Bellucci caught the attention of American audiences with Stephen Hopkins' Under Suspicion, her first English-language lead role, in which she starred opposite Morgan Freeman and Gene Hackman. Hopkins hired Bellucci after observing her perform in The Apartment and retained Bellucci's ideas for creating the character of Chantal. At this point, an improved spoken English was noted. After the film's release, Freeman said, "It's all there in her eyes. She has this quality that reminds me of Jeanne Moreau." Under Suspicion was selected as one of the 2000 Cannes Film Festival's closing films, marking her red carpet debut at the annual event. Bellucci returned to Italian cinema in 2000 when she portrayed an enigmatic, envied and coveted war widow whose life unfolded before the captivated eyes of a 13-year-old boy in the Tornatore-directed film Malèna. Mark Salisbury of The Guardian considered Bellucci's role in the Oscar-nominated film as her "breakout performance". She began to become known and popular with global audiences thanks to Malèna. Malèna was Bellucci's first international success and, in addition to her allure, caused her to be "besieged by offers" from Hollywood when Miramax secured the film for US distribution. For the US release, 10 minutes of explicit erotic scenes from the film were removed due to censorship in North America. 

In 2001, Bellucci had a role in Brotherhood of the Wolf, which also starred  Samuel Le Bihan and Vincent Cassel, a French film based on historical events involving the beast of Gévaudan that decimated the population of Gévaudan in Lozère in 18th-century France. Brotherhood of the Wolf was a box-office success, attracting 5 million viewers to French movie theatres and grossing  million worldwide, including $11 million in the US, against a budget of  million ($34 million). Writing for The Washington Post, Stephen Hunter found the film's stylistic approach too dense, obscuring Bellucci's "fabulous natural asset", who played an "underused" role as a courtesan–papist spy. The film received mainly positive responses from critics.

In 2002, Bellucci co-starred with Cassel in the "violent" arthouse thriller Irréversible by Gaspar Noé. Shot on 16 mm with hand-held cameras, the revenge film depicted Bellucci playing Alex, where she was also seen graphically raped for nine minutes without a break in an underpass, a scene she had to shoot four times. Bellucci's "indelible scene" was filmed in an underpass frequented by prostitutes on the outskirts of Paris. Bellucci and Cassel, a couple at the time, were some of "the country's biggest talents". Irréversible premiered at the 2002 Cannes Film Festival at midnight on 24 May and was immediately described as "unsustainable", while others called it an "accomplished work". Causing outrage, it was reported "visceral" reactions from the audience during the film's screening, including fainting, nervous breakdowns and 200 hasty departures, and people passed out in the lobby. Lisa Nesselson of Variety thought Bellucci showed "responses to peril and joy particularly memorable". Subsequently, the film has been studied in film schools. Noé later stated he "has never seen an actress so charismatic, with that much guts ... her performance is incredibly audacious", while Bellucci revealed that now being a mother, her "days of acting in transgressive movies are behind her". K. Austin Collins of Rolling Stone called Irréversible "one of the most controversial movies ever".

In 2003, Bellucci co-starred with Bruce Willis in Antoine Fuqua's Tears of the Sun, an action-adventure film set in a civil war in Nigeria. She played the role of doctor Lena Kendricks, working for a humanitarian organisation within a village threatened by rebels. The New Yorker film critic David Denby felt that some of Bellucci's scenes were exaggeratedly stylised but praised the film's visual prowess. Tears of the Sun garnered mixed reviews from critics and was a box-office disappointment. The same year, Bellucci portrayed Persephone successively in The Matrix Reloaded and The Matrix Revolutions. She described her character as "dangerous, sensual with some sense of humor", recalling fond memories with Keanu Reeves, Carrie-Anne Moss, and Laurence Fishburne throughout the filming process in Australia. The Guardian film critic Peter Bradshaw gave The Matrix Reloaded a positive review, grossing $742.1 million worldwide against a budget of $127 million. The character of the Merovingian, played by French actor Lambert Wilson, once again accompanied Bellucci as her husband in The Matrix Revolutions, but the film received mixed to average reviews from critics. However, it grossed $427 million against a production and marketing budget of $185 million.

In Rome, before the shooting of Tears of the Sun, Bellucci was notified that a film about Jesus Christ by Mel Gibson was in the works and asked to meet with him for the role of Mary Magdalene. Her agent advised her against making this film due to its potential failure, as its distribution was unknown at the time. However, she ignored his suggestion and turned down another film. Gibson chose her because they "liked each other". Eventually, Bellucci starred a fearful and compassionate Mary Magdalene in Gibson's 2004 film The Passion of the Christ, which depicted the final hours of the life of Jesus Christ. In the film portraying a "fundamentalist" view of the Gospel, Bellucci stood out the most from the cast list, wrote Le Monde, and The New York Times film critic A. O. Scott expressed a converging opinion, saying she was the one "exception" to the "absence of identifiable movie stars". The film features dialogues in Aramaic and Latin languages that she had to learn expressly. Catholics, meanwhile, objected that Bellucci played Mary Magdalene. Film critic Roger Ebert described The Passion of the Christ as "the most violent film I have ever seen", adding he was "moved by the depth of feeling, by the skill of the actors" and gave the film a rating of 4 stars out of 4, though it received generally mixed reviews. The Passion of the Christ was a major commercial success, with a worldwide gross of over $611 million against a budget of $30 million.

She has since played in many films from Europe and Hollywood like The Brothers Grimm (2005), Le Deuxième souffle (2007), Shoot 'Em Up (2007), Don't Look Back (2009) and The Sorcerer's Apprentice (2010).

She also voiced Kaileena in the video game Prince of Persia: Warrior Within and the French voice of Cappy for the French version of the 2005 animated film Robots. She was supposed to be seen portraying Indian politician Sonia Gandhi in the biopic Sonia, initially planned for release in 2007, but it has been shelved. Bellucci dubbed her own voice for the French and Italian releases of the film Shoot 'Em Up (2007), saying it was a frequent practice to "do each film three times".

At 50, she became the oldest Bond girl ever in the James Bond film franchise, playing Lucia Sciarra in Spectre (2015).

In 2007, Bellucci received a Donostia Award, an honorary award recognising her entire career. She later appeared in the Australian film Nekrotronic.

In 2021, she received a David Special Award to recognise her career achievement at the 66th David di Donatello ceremony.

Other activities
Bellucci was mistress of ceremonies of the 56th Cannes Film Festival, presiding over the opening and closing ceremonies held on the Croisette from 14 to 25 May 2003. From 17 to 28 May 2006, she was a jury member of the 59th Cannes Film Festival. Bellucci returned to her role of mistress of ceremonies at the 70th Cannes Film Festival, in charge of opening and closing one of the major international film events, which took place from 17 to 28 May 2017. In 2017, Bellucci was invited by the Academy of Motion Picture Arts and Sciences to be a permanent member representing Italy, becoming one of the voting juries responsible for awarding the annual Academy Awards (Oscars). From 26 to 30  September 2018, she chaired the judging panel of the 29th Dinard British Film Festival. Bellucci was to be chairwoman of the 15th Crystal Globe Awards, scheduled for 14 March 2020 at the Wagram auditorium in Paris, but the ceremony was cancelled due to the coronavirus pandemic.

Bellucci has been involved in French state dinners known for being official dinners chaired by the President of the French Republic and organised as part of foreign heads of state visits. On 21 November 2012, she attended the state dinner hosted by French president François Hollande at the Elysée Palace in Paris on the occasion of the visit of Italian President Giorgio Napolitano and his ministers. On 5 July 2021, she was invited to a state dinner hosted by French president Emmanuel Macron at the Elysée Palace in honour of Italian President Sergio Mattarella and his daughter Laura. Among the participants were French ministers, LVMH Moët Hennessy Louis Vuitton's co-founder, chairman and CEO Bernard Arnault, Dior's creative director Maria Grazia Chiuri, Kering's chairman and CEO François-Henri Pinault, and French actress Carole Bouquet.

Public image
In 2001, Bellucci appeared on the cover of Esquires Desire issue. In his 2001 review of Malèna, CNN International's Paul Tatara called Bellucci a "world-class bombshell". AskMen named her the number one ranking of the most desirable woman of 2002. In 2003, Chris Campion of The Daily Telegraph wrote that La Bellucci' is Italy's national sweetheart and an icon of European cinema". In 2004, Bellucci was voted "the most beautiful woman in the world" based on a survey of 1000 people in France commissioned by TF1. Paris' Grévin Museum unveiled a wax statue of her in April 2005. Also dubbed "Bella Bellucci", she was called "arguably the world's most beautiful actress" by The Times staff writers. They suggested that she has, by contrast, the propensity to specialise in acting "[u]gly scenes", which they exemplified by the rape scene of the 2002 film Irreversible. In 2005, Mark Salisbury of The Guardian wrote that she represents an "international object of desire" and said, "[i]n person, as on screen, Bellucci radiates a rare, otherworldly beauty." French actor Bernard Blier said, "She's completely relaxed with her image and with her own sense of modesty as well." Blier compared her to "Ava Gardner, the stars of yesteryear". 

On 9 May 2008, the news magazine L'Obs reported on a survey of 1,003 people conducted by the Superior Audiovisual Council as part of Europe Day, where Bellucci was the second of the European personalities (excluding France) favourite of the French. In 2011, she was ranked fourth in Los Angeles Times Magazines list of the 50 most beautiful women in film. Bellucci was featured in Empires "Sexiest Women" list. She appeared on Men's Healths list of the "100 Hottest Sex Symbols of All Time", encompassing both women and men, and the magazine's Australian edition also named her one of the "100 Hottest Women Of All Time", ranking her at No. 21. In June 2021, Vogue ranked her fourth of the "most beautiful Italian actresses of all time". She is considered an Italian sex symbol by the media. Rolling Stone Italy included Bellucci in its "10 greatest sex symbols of the 1990s" list, in no particular order. The press refers to her as a style icon. In January 2023, Elisabeth Vincentelli of The New York Times wrote that she has a "reputation as a symbol of European glamour and sophistication" that is "firmly established".

Personal life
At the age of 20, Bellucci married Italian photographer Claudio Carlos Basso; they divorced after six months.

From 1989 to 1995, she had a relationship with Italian actor Nicola Farron.

She met French actor Vincent Cassel on the set of their 1996 film The Apartment. They married on 2 August 1999 in Monaco. Bellucci and Cassel have two daughters, Deva Cassel (born 12 September 2004) and Léonie (born 21 May 2010). Their daughters were born in Rome. Bellucci and Cassel acted together in nine films from 1996 to 2006. The couple announced their separation on 26 August 2013 and later divorced. At the end of 2014, Bellucci said she was still enamoured of Cassel; both have remained close ever since. 

After her divorce, Bellucci was in a relationship with French sculptor and former model Nicolas Lefebvre. They had been dating since 2017. They made it official in early March 2019 during a Chanel show at the Grand Palais in Paris. Lefebvre was then 37 years old. She told Italian magazine F about the end of their relationship, announced by the media in early July 2019.

In October 2022, Bellucci and American director Tim Burton met at the Lumière Film Festival in Lyon, and their relationship was announced in February 2023.

Bellucci lived with Cassel and their daughters in Italy, France, Brazil, and England. In 2015, she decided to settle in Paris. Bellucci has said that "Paris is part of my history" but considers herself "completely Italian". Everything in me is Italian." She has houses in Rome and Lisbon in the neighbourhood of Saint George's Castle. During the coronavirus lockdowns, Bellucci and Cassel lived in two nearby houses on the Basque coast (Pyrénées-Atlantiques) so that the latter could see his daughters and thus continue to share parental duties. She said she votes in Italy, not France.

Bellucci is fluent in Italian, French, and English, and has knowledge of Portuguese and Spanish languages. She acted in Aramaic, Persian, and Serbian languages. 

Despite having received a Catholic education, Bellucci called herself an agnostic. She said, "I am an agnostic, even though I respect and am interested in all religions ... If there's something I believe in, it's a mysterious energy; the one that fills the oceans during tides, the one that unites nature and beings." She said of her personality that "a lot of positivity also depends on the climate in which my parents raised me." 

In 2009, Bellucci signed a petition in support of director Roman Polanski, who had been detained while traveling to a film festival in relation to his 1977 sexual abuse charges, which the petition argued would undermine the tradition of film festivals as a place for works to be shown "freely and safely", and that arresting filmmakers travelling to neutral countries could open the door "for actions of which no-one can know the effects."

In 2020, GEDI Gruppo Editoriale's alfemminile website ranked Bellucci as the third richest actress in Italy, with wealth valued at $45 million.

Filmography

Film

Television

Video games

Dubbing roles

Accolades

Awards and nominations

Special awards

State honours

Decorations
 Knight of the Order of Arts and LettersIn 2006, Bellucci was conferred with the Knight of the Order of Arts and Letters by the Minister of the Interior and future President of France, Nicolas Sarkozy, at the Élysée Palace.

 Knight of the Legion of HonourIn 2016, she received the Legion of Honour from the President of France François Hollande at the Élysée Palace.

Other honours

References

External links

 http://www.monicabellucci.net at Official Web Site
 
 
 
 
 
 

1964 births
Living people
People from Città di Castello
Italian female models
Italian film actresses
Italian video game actresses
Italian agnostics
20th-century Italian actresses
21st-century Italian actresses
University of Perugia alumni
Italian expatriates in Brazil
Italian expatriates in England
Italian expatriates in France
Italian expatriates in Portugal
Italian expatriates in the United States
David di Donatello winners
Magritte Award winners
Nastro d'Argento winners
People named in the Pandora Papers